Palacio Multiusos de Guadalajara, also known as Polideportivo de Aguas Vivas, is an arena in Guadalajara, Spain. It is primarily used for basketball, volleyball, handball and futsal. The capacity of the arena is 5,894 people. It was a venue for the 2013 World Men's Handball Championship.

References

Guadalajara
Guadalajara
Buildings and structures in Guadalajara, Spain
Sports venues completed in 2010
Handball venues in Spain
Sport in Guadalajara, Spain
Sports venues in Castilla–La Mancha